The  is a railway line operated by Japanese private railway company Tobu Railway in Tokyo.

Operations
All trains are two-car 8000 series formations operating as all-stations "Local" services, with no through trains to the Tobu Skytree Line.

Stations

Rolling stock

Services on the line are operated using a fleet of two-car  8000 series EMU trains.

Revival liveries
From 23 March 2016, two-car set 8577, used on the Tobu Kameido Line and Tobu Daishi Line, received the "international orange" and "medium yellow" livery carried by 7300 and 7800 series trains between 1958 and 1964.

From 16 February 2017, two-car set 8568, used on the Tobu Kameido Line and Tobu Daishi Line, received the green and "jasmine white" livery carried experimentally by one 7860 series train in the 1950s.

History
The line opened on 5 April 1904.

From 17 March 2012, station numbering was introduced on all Tobu lines. Tobu Kameido Line stations were numbered prefixed with the letters "TS".

References

External links
 Tobu Railway Kameido Line information page 

Kameido Line
Railway lines in Tokyo